The Haiti women's national football team  participates in several competitions including the CONCACAF Women's Championship. The team also participates in qualification for the FIFA Women's World Cup and Summer Olympics, and qualified for their first World Cup at the 2023  edition. The team is controlled by the Fédération Haïtienne de Football.  They are one of the top women's national football teams in the Caribbean region along with Jamaica and Trinidad & Tobago. Haiti women's national football team is currently coached by Nicolas Delépine.

Team image

Home stadium
The Haiti women's national team play their home matches on the Stade Sylvio Cator.

Results and fixtures

The following is a list of match results in the last 12 months, as well as any future matches that have been scheduled.

2022

2023

Coaching staff

Current coaching staff

Players

Current squad
 The following players were  pre list ahead of a training camp in Portugal.
 Caps and goals are updated as of 17 February 2022 after the match against .

Recent call ups
 The following players have been called up to a Haiti squad in the past 12 months.

Competitive record

FIFA Women's World Cup

*Draws include knockout matches decided on penalty kicks.

Olympic Games

*Draws include knockout matches decided on penalty kicks.

CONCACAF W Championship

*Draws include knockout matches decided on penalty kicks.

Pan American Games

*Draws include knockout matches decided on penalty kicks.

Central American and Caribbean Games

*Draws include knockout matches decided on penalty kicks.

CFU Women's Caribbean Cup

*Draws include knockout matches decided on penalty kicks.

See also

Sport in Haiti
Football in Haiti
Women's football in Haiti
Haiti women's national under-20 football team
Haiti women's national under-17 football team
Haiti men's national football team

References

External links
Official website 
FIFA profile
Haiti women’s national football team picture